The 1992 Big West Conference men's basketball tournament was held March 13–15 at the Long Beach Arena in Long Beach, California.

New Mexico State defeated  in the final, 74–73, capturing their first Big West title. Three-time defending champions UNLV did not participate in this year's tournament due to NCAA sanctions.

The Aggies subsequently received an automatic bid to the 1992 NCAA tournament.

Format
There were no changed to the tournament format for this season, with the Big West maintaining an eight-team tournament. In turn, only the top eight teams, based on regular season conference records, qualified for the tournament field. 

UNLV, who finished first in the regular season standings, were barred from participating due to NCAA sanctions.

All eight teams were entered in the initial round, paired and seeded based on record.

Bracket

References

Big West Conference men's basketball tournament
Tournament
Big West Conference men's basketball tournament
Big West Conference men's basketball tournament